Hilda Alexandra Wiseman (1894–1982) was a notable New Zealand bookplate designer, artist and calligrapher.

Wiseman was born in Mooroopna, Victoria, Australia on 7 April 1894.

She attended Elam School of Art, and Seddon Memorial Technical College

Wiseman began her artistic career as a commercial artist at the Chandler and Company advertising firm. In 1925 she created her first linocut bookplate She went on to design over 100 bookplates.

In 1931 she started her own studio, the Selwyn Studio.

At the time of her death in 1982 the Auckland Historical Society received her bequest of the Selwyn Studio, and its contents.

References

1894 births
1982 deaths
20th-century New Zealand women artists
20th-century calligraphers
Australian calligraphers
Australian commercial artists
Australian emigrants to New Zealand
New Zealand calligraphers
New Zealand designers
People from Mooroopna
Women calligraphers